Agapia is a commune in Neamț County, Western Moldavia, Romania. It is composed of four villages: Agapia, Filioara, Săcălușești and Văratec. At the 2002 census, 100% of inhabitants were ethnic Romanians, and 99.2% were Romanian Orthodox. The commune is the site of Agapia Monastery and Văratec Monastery.

Natives
 Constanța Marino-Moscu

References

Communes in Neamț County
Localities in Western Moldavia